Bogdan Ivanov (born July 22, 1937) is a Bulgarian sprint canoer who competed in the early to mid-1960s. Competing two Summer Olympics, he earned his best finish of sixth in the C-1 1000 m event at Tokyo in 1964.

References
Sports-reference.com profile

1937 births
Bulgarian male canoeists
Canoeists at the 1960 Summer Olympics
Canoeists at the 1964 Summer Olympics
Living people
Olympic canoeists of Bulgaria